The 1997 Singer-Akai Champions Trophy was held in Sharjah, UAE, between December 11-19, 1997. Four national teams took part: England, India, Pakistan, and West Indies.

The 1997 Singer-Akai Champions Trophy started with a round-robin tournament where each team played the other once. The two leading teams qualified for the final. England won the tournament and US$40,000. Runners-up West Indies won US$25,000.

Squads

Group stage points table

Group stage

1st Match

2nd Match

3rd Match

4th Match

5th Match

6th Match

Final

See also
 Sharjah Cup

References

 Cricket Archive: Singer-Akai Champions Trophy 1997/98
 ESPNCricinfo: Akai-Singer Champions Trophy, 1997/98
 

International cricket competitions from 1997–98 to 2000
Singer-Akai Champions Trophy, 1997
1997 in Emirati sport
International cricket competitions in the United Arab Emirates